Yanis Leerman (born 15 June 1998) is a French professional footballer who plays as a defender for the USL Championship club Loudoun United.

Career

Early career
Leerman joined the Troyes academy in 2004, where he played until 2014. He went on to have spells in the lower leagues with RCS La Chapelle and FCA Troyes. He was a Regional Champion with La Chapelle and won the Championship with FCA Troyes in 2018.

College & MLS SuperDraft 
In 2018, Leerman left France to attend the University of Central Florida to play college soccer. In four seasons with the Knights, Leerman made 60 appearances, scoring a single goal and tallying five assists. In his freshman season, Leerman was named Third Team All-East Region his sophomore season saw him earn First Team All-East Region and All-Conference First Team honors. His junior and senior years saw further accolades, including been named an All-American, landing on the Second Team, becoming the ninth All-American in program history, All-Conference First Team, and was named to The American's All-Tournament Team. In 2021's senior year he was named to the American Athletic Conference All-Conference Second Team, and began the season on the MAC Hermann Trophy Watch List.

On 12 January 2022, Leerman was selected 85th overall in the 2022 MLS SuperDraft by Chicago Fire. However, he wasn't signed by the club and instead opted to return for a further year at college, attending the University of Pittsburgh as a graduate student and appeared in 12 matches for the Panthers.

Professional
Leerman signed with USL Championship club Loudoun United on 18 January 2023. He made his professional on 11 March 2023, starting in a 3–1 away victory over Memphis 901.

References

1998 births
Living people
Association football defenders
Chicago Fire FC draft picks
Expatriate soccer players in the United States
French expatriate footballers
French expatriate sportspeople in the United States
French footballers
Loudoun United FC players
Pittsburgh Panthers men's soccer players
UCF Knights men's soccer players
USL Championship players